Lu Hsiu-yi was a Taiwanese politician and member of the Legislative Yuan.

Early life 
On May 22, 1941, Lu was born in Taiwan while it was under control of Empire of Japan.
At age 6, Lu's father died. As a result, the income of his family depended on his mother. 
Lu was the only child. Lu graduated from the Taipei Municipal Jianguo High School.

Education 
In 1980, Lu earned a PhD. in political science from University of Paris in Nanterre.

Lu attended the National Chengchi University majoring political science. Lu earned his master's degree from the Chinese Culture University.

Career 
Lu was a professor at Chinese Culture University and National Tsinghua University.

In January 1983, Lu was arrested and served time in prison until 1986. Lu's crime was "sedition" on promoting Taiwan independence.

In February 1990, Lu started his political career as a member of the Legislative Yuan for Taipei county in Taiwan.

Personal life 
Lu married Tchen Yu-chiou. Lu's daughter is Chia-Hui Lu, a classical pianist.

Since 1995, Lu has been suffering from lung cancer.

On August 16, 1998, Lu died in Tamsui, near Taipei, Taiwan. He was 57.

References

External links 

1941 births
1998 deaths
Democratic Progressive Party Members of the Legislative Yuan
Members of the 1st Legislative Yuan in Taiwan
Taiwanese political scientists
Taiwan independence activists
University of Paris alumni
New Taipei Members of the Legislative Yuan
Members of the 2nd Legislative Yuan
Members of the 3rd Legislative Yuan
20th-century political scientists